Cinema in Sudan: conversations with Gadalla Gubara is a French 2008 documentary film.

Synopsis 
This documentary portrays a great Sudanese filmmaker, Gadalla Gubara (1920-2008), one of the pioneers of cinema in Africa. Through his works, Gadalla shows us a mysterious and misunderstood country, Sudan. Despite censorship and the lack of financial backing for over sixty years, he produced an independent and unique cinema in a country where freedom of expression is a rare luxury. This film follows the struggle of the man who received the Excellence Career Award at the 2006 African Academy Awards, Nigeria.

References

External links 

2008 films
French documentary films
2008 documentary films
Documentary films about African cinema
Documentary films about film directors and producers
Sudanese culture
Documentary films about Sudan
2000s French films